Hiram Wild (15 March 1917 - 28 April 1982) was an English botanist who worked in Southern Rhodesia. 

Wild studied at Imperial College, University of London. In 1945, he wrote his Ph.D. thesis in which he examined the lettuce pathogen, Bremia lactucae. From 1945, he worked as the government botanist in Southern Rhodesia, and soon became head of the Government Herbarium of Southern Rhodesia. In 1960, Wild started the Herbarium botanical journal 'Kirkia', named for John Kirk (1832–1922), African explorer and companion of David Livingstone. In the ensuing years, he worked as its chief editor. Wild, along with Arthur Wallis Exell, initiated the Flora Zambesiaca project, a series of monographs on the flora of Africa. In 1965, Wild was appointed professor at Salisbury University College, now known as the University of Zimbabwe.

In 1980, due to ill-health, he resigned as professor at Salisbury and moved to Cape Town, South Africa.

Personal life
Hiram was the son of Hiram Wild (*July 1895, Sheffield, Yorkshire) and Margaret Hawksworth (*13 May 1896 Sheffield, Yorkshire)
He married Kathleen Mabel Jean Osborne (*8 July 1918 Cape Town) in 1945.
They had 6 children.

Selected publications
Wild, H. 'Vegetation of copper-bearing soils' - Salisbury, 1968. - 71 p.
Wild, H. 'The vegetation of nickel-bearing soils' - Causeway, 1970. - 62 p.

Plants named for Hiram Wild
Aristida wildii Melderis, 1970
Buchnera wildii Philcox, 1987
Clerodendrum wildii Moldenke, 1949 (= Rotheca wildii (Moldenke) R. Fern, 2000
Commiphora wildii Merxm. 1960
Cynoglossum wildii E.S. Martins, 1988
Erica wildii Brenan, 1964
Eriocaulon wildii S. M. Phillips, 1997
Euphorbia wildii L.C. Leach, 1975
Wildiana indigofera J.B.Gillett, 1958
Kalanchoe wildii Raym.-Hamet ex R. Fern., 1978
Lotus wildii J. B. Gillett, 1959
Pandiaka wildii Suess. 1950
Rhus wildii R.  Fern. & A.Fern. 1965 - Searsia wildii ( R. Fern . & A. Fern .) Moffett, 2007
Rhynchosia wildii Verdc., 2000
Vernonia wildii Merxm., 1951

References

1917 births
1982 deaths
English botanists
People from Sheffield
British expatriates in Southern Rhodesia